WTRH 93.3 FM is a radio station broadcasting a news talk format. Licensed to Ramsey, Illinois, United States, the station serves the Vandalia, Illinois area, and is currently owned by Countryside Broadcasting.

WTRH also airs Oldies music on Saturdays, along with old time radio, and airs Gospel Music on Sundays along with religious programming.

References

External links
WTRH's official website

TRH
News and talk radio stations in the United States